Mundu SC is a Zanzibar football club based in Nungwi near Unguja in East Africa.
The club is one of the three biggest football clubs in Unguja.

Currently the team competes in the Zanzibar Premier League.

The club competed in the CAF Confederation Cup for the first time in 2007.

Stadium
Currently the team plays at the 5000 capacity Unguja Park.

Performance in CAF competitions
CAF Confederation Cup: 2 appearances
2007,2009

References

External links
Scoreshelf
FootballDatabase
Calciozz

Football clubs in Tanzania
Zanzibari football clubs